Srinu Vaitla (born 24 September 1972) is an Indian film director who works in Telugu cinema. Known for his best film works in the action comedy genre, Vaitla made his directional debut with Nee Kosam (1999) starring Ravi Teja and Maheswari. His second directorial venture Anandam (2001) gave him recognition as a director. He went on to direct many Telugu films such as Sontham, Venky, Dhee, Dubai Seenu, Ready, King, Dookudu, and Baadshah. Since his film Venky, he has successfully collaborated with Kona Venkat and Gopi Mohan who guide him in writing screenplay in further of his films.

Filmography

As actor
Rainbow (2008)

Awards
 Nandi Award for Best Feature Film (Nee Kosam)
 Nandi Award for Best First Film of a Director (Nee Kosam)
 Nandi Award for Best Screenplay Writer (Nee Kosam)
 Nandi Award for Best Screenplay Writer (Dhee)
 Nandi Award for Best Screenplay Writer (Dookudu)
 Filmfare Award for Best Director - Telugu (Dookudu)
 CinemAA Awards – Best Director (Dookudu)
 South Indian International Movie Awards – Best Director (Dookudu)
 Times of India  Film Awards – Best Director (Dookudu)

References

External links

Living people
Film directors from Andhra Pradesh
Nandi Award winners
CineMAA Awards winners
South Indian International Movie Awards winners
Filmfare Awards South winners
People from East Godavari district
20th-century Indian film directors
21st-century Indian film directors
1972 births